HH Maharaja Sir Bir Singh Judeo Bahadur, KCIE (1864 - 1936) was a Gurjar ruler of Samthar State from 17 Jun 1896 - 9 Oct 1935, when he abdicated throne due to old age in favour of his son  Radha Charan Singh. He was knighted KCIE on 3 Jun 1915.

References

1864 births
1936 deaths
Indian royalty
Knights Commander of the Order of the Indian Empire
Maharajas of Samthar